Potassium ferrioxalate, also called potassium trisoxalatoferrate or potassium tris(oxalato)ferrate(III) is a chemical compound with the formula []. It often occurs as the trihydrate . Both are crystalline compounds, lime green in colour. 

The compound is a salt consisting of ferrioxalate anions, and potassium cations . The anion is a transition metal complex consisting of an iron atom in the +3 oxidation state and three bidentate oxalate ions  anions acting as ligands.  Potassium acts as a counterion, balancing the −3 charge of the complex.  In solution, the salt dissociates to give the ferrioxalate anion, []3−, which appears fluorescent green in color.

The ferrioxalate anion is quite stable in the dark, but is decomposed by light and high-energy electromagnetic radiation. This photo-sensitive property is used for chemical actinometry, the measure of luminous flux, and for preparation of blueprints.

Preparation
The complex can be synthesized by the reaction between iron(III) sulfate, barium oxalate and potassium oxalate:
  + 3  + 3  → 2 [] + 3 
As can be read in the reference above, iron(III) sulfate, barium oxalate and potassium oxalate are combined in water and digested for several hours on a steam bath.

Structure
The structures of the trihydrate and of the anhydrous salt have been extensively studied. which indicates that the Fe(III) is high spin; as the low spin complex would display Jahn–Teller distortions. The ammonium and mixed sodium-potassium salts are isomorphous, as are related complexes with Al3+, Cr3+, and V3+.

The ferrioxalate complex displays helical chirality as it can form two non-superimposable geometries. In accordance with the IUPAC convention, the isomer with the left-handed screw axis is assigned the Greek symbol Λ (lambda). Its mirror image with the right-handed screw axis is given the Greek symbol Δ (delta).

Reactions

Photoreduction
The ferrioxalate anion is sensitive to light and to high-energy electromagnetic radiation, including X-rays and gamma rays.  Absorption of a photon causes the decomposition of one oxalate ion to carbon dioxide  and reduction of the iron(III) atom to iron(II).

Thermal decomposition
The trihydrate loses the three water molecules at the same time when heated at 113 °C.

At 296 °C, the anhydrous salt decomposes into the iron(II) complex potassium ferrioxalate, potassium oxalate, and carbon dioxide:
 2 [] → 2 [] +  + 2 

This light-catalyzed redox reaction once formed the basis of some photographic processes. However due to their insensitivity and ready availability of advanced digital photography, these processes have become obsolete.

Uses

Photometry and actinometry
The discovery of the efficient photolysis of the ferrioxalate anion was a landmark for chemical photochemistry and actinometry. The potassium salt was found to be over 1000 times more sensitive than uranyl oxalate, the compound previously used for these purposes.

Chemistry education
The synthesis and thermal decomposition of potassium ferrioxalate is a popular exercise for high school, college or undergraduate university students, since it involves the chemistry of transition metal complexes, visually observable photochemistry, and thermogravimetry.

Blueprints
Before the ready availability of wide ink-jet and laser printers, large-size engineering drawings were commonly reproduced by the cyanotype method.

That was a simple contact-based photographic process that produced a "negative" white-on-blue copy of the original drawing—a blueprint. The process is based on the photolysis of an iron(III) complex which gets converted into an insoluble iron(II) version in areas of the paper that were exposed to light.

The complex used in cyanotype is mainly ammonium iron(III) citrate, but potassium ferrioxalate is also used.

See also
A number of other iron oxalates are known
 Iron(II) oxalate
 Iron(III) oxalate
 Sodium ferrioxalate

References

Iron complexes
Iron(III) compounds
Potassium compounds
Oxalato complexes
Ferrates